Pentelis railway station is a station located on the borders of the municipalities of Vrilissia, Maroussi, and Chalandri Greece. It was first opened on 21 February 2007 and is located in the median strip of Motorway 6, at the interchange of Pentelis Avenue, at the intersection of which with the railway line SKA - Athens International Airport has been built, from which the station is named. The station consists of an island platform and a train storage line.

History
The station opened on 21 February 2007, by the Greek Minister of Transport and Communications, Michalis Liapis. In 2009, with the Greek debt crisis unfolding OSE's Management was forced to reduce services across the network. Timetables were cutback, and routes closed as the government-run entity attempted to reduce overheads. Services from Athens Airport & Athens were cut back, with some ticket offices closing, reducing the reliability of services, and passenger numbers. In 2017 OSE's passenger transport sector was privatised as TrainOSE, currently, a wholly owned subsidiary of Ferrovie dello Stato Italiane infrastructure, including stations, remained under the control of OSE.

Facilities
The station has a ticket office and cafe. At platform level, the station is equipped with Dot-matrix display departure and arrival screens on the platforms for passenger information, seating, and information boards, with access to the platforms via life or escalator. Outside the station, there is a bus stop where the local 450, 460 & 461 call. Parking is also available at the station.

Services

Since 15 May 2022, the following weekday services call at this station:

Station layout

References

2007 establishments in Greece
Buildings and structures in North Athens
Marousi
Railway stations in Attica
Railway stations in highway medians
Railway stations opened in 2007
Transport in North Athens